In statistical mechanics, the translational partition function,  is that part of the partition function resulting from the movement (translation) of the center of mass. For a single atom or molecule in a low pressure gas,  neglecting the interactions of molecules, the canonical ensemble  can be approximated by:

 where  

Here, V is the volume of the container holding the molecule (volume per single molecule so, e.g., for 1 mole of gas the container volume should be divided by the Avogadro number), Λ is the Thermal de Broglie wavelength, h is the Planck constant, m is the mass of a molecule, kB is the Boltzmann constant and T is the absolute temperature.
This approximation is valid as long as Λ is much less than any dimension of the volume the atom or molecule is in.  Since  typical values of Λ are on the order of 10-100 pm, this is almost always an excellent approximation. 

When considering a set of N non-interacting but identical atoms or molecules, when QT ≫ N , or equivalently when ρ Λ ≪ 1 where ρ is the density of particles, the total translational partition function can be written

The factor of N! arises from the restriction of allowed N particle states due to  Quantum exchange symmetry.
Most substances form liquids or solids at temperatures much higher than when this approximation breaks down significantly.

See also
 Rotational partition function
 Vibrational partition function
 Partition function (mathematics)

References

Sources

Partition functions